The Potato Museum is a non-profit organisation dedicated to the history and social influence of the vegetable that has most influenced people and places. It is the world's largest collection of potato related items assembled from around the world.

History
It started as a classroom project by the students of teacher Tom Hughes at The International School of Brussels, Belgium in 1975.

The museum was  based in Washington, D.C., for several years and open by appointment only.

In the early 1990s The Potato Museum's collections were involved in two major national exhibitions, one at Ottawa's National Museum of Science and Technology, the other at the Smithsonian's National Museum of Natural History. The museum moved to Albuquerque, New Mexico, in 1993.  Hughes and his wife, Meredith Hughes, started a spinoff website, the Food Museum, in 1996.

Artifacts
The museum's collections include:
Ancient specimens and pottery depicting potatoes
Farm tools
Modern potato-derived products
Curiosities made from potatoes

References

External links
 
 The Potato Museum timeline
 The Food Museum online

Food museums in the United States
Potato museums
Non-profit organizations based in New Mexico
Museums in Albuquerque, New Mexico
History museums in New Mexico